The John A. Burns School of Medicine (JABSOM) is part of the University of Hawaiʻi at Mānoa, and is located on the island of O‘ahu, approximately three miles west of the university's Mānoa campus. The school was named after former Hawaiian Governor John A. Burns in 1965.

References

External links
Official website

1965 establishments in Hawaii
Medical schools in Hawaii
University of Hawaiʻi
Public schools in Honolulu
Educational institutions established in 1965